Carmellini is an Italian surname. Notable people with the surname include:

Andrew Carmellini (born 1971), American chef and restaurateur
Omero Carmellini (1921–1997), Italian footballer
Tommy Carmellini, the hero of novels by Stephen Coonts

Italian-language surnames